County Market is a supermarket chain primarily operating in the Midwestern United States. Presently, more than 100 independently owned County Market stores operate in Illinois, Indiana, Iowa, and Missouri. County Market is part of the United Natural Foods company since the latter's acquisition of SuperValu in 2018.

Many stores are located in smaller cities such as Farmington, IL and typically feature an in-store bakery and deli.

See also
 Supermarkets in the United States

References

External links
 

Economy of the Midwestern United States
Economy of the Southeastern United States
Supermarkets of the United States
Franchises